Sunita Duggal (born 29 April 1968) is an Indian politician and the current Member of Parliament (Lok Sabha) from Sirsa parliamentary constituency and currently the only Woman Member of Parliament (MP) from Haryana.

She served in Income Tax Department for 22 years at various posts. She took VRS from Indian Revenue Service as Assistant Commissioner of Income Tax in 2014, her husband is a reputed Indian Police Service (IPS) officer of Haryana cadre. She contested Haryana Vidhan Sabha Elections 2014 from Ratia but lost them by just 453 votes, because of her good educational background as well as bureaucratic experience she was appointed as Chairperson HSCFDC in Haryana Govt.

References

India MPs 2019–present
Lok Sabha members from Haryana
Living people
Bharatiya Janata Party politicians from Haryana
People from Sirsa, Haryana
Women in Haryana politics
1968 births
21st-century Indian women politicians